First Dates is an Australian reality dating television show currently broadcast on Network 10. Narrated by Tommy Little, the format is based on a British program of the same name. The first four seasons previously aired on Seven Network and were narrated by Sam Mac.

Premise
The program follows two strangers, who have been matched up by a relationship expert, meeting for a first date at a restaurant in Sydney. At the end of the date, the couples are interviewed together and asked whether they would like to see each other again.

During filming of the date, there are no producers or cameramen in the restaurant, to ensure the "authenticity of the date," with cameras being remotely operated.

Broadcast
The eight episode first season premiered on the Seven Network on 3 February 2016 airing on Wednesday at 9 pm. The second season premiered on 1 November 2016, with six episodes airing on either Tuesday or Wednesday at 7:30 pm. The remaining two episodes of the season aired on 10 and 11 April 2017. In May 2017, the series was renewed for a third season. The series was renewed for a fourth season which aired in 2018.

The series was cancelled by Seven in October 2020. However casting for a fifth season was announced, with the series confirmed to be switching to Network 10. Applications closed on 1 November 2021. The fifth season (and the first for 10) began airing from 24 February 2022.

International broadcasts

In June 2016, the series began broadcasting in the United Kingdom under the title First Dates Abroad on E4.

Episodes

Season 1 (2016)

Season 2 (2016–2017)

Season 3 (2017–2018)

Season 4 (2020)

Season 5 (2022)

References

External links

2016 Australian television series debuts
2020 Australian television series endings
Australian dating and relationship reality television series
2010s Australian reality television series
English-language television shows
Seven Network original programming
Television series by Warner Bros. Television Studios
2020s Australian reality television series